ILAsm (IL Assembler) generates a portable executable (PE) file from a text representation of Common Intermediate Language (CIL) code. It is not to be confused with NGEN (Native Image Generator), which compiles Common Intermediate Language code into native code as a .NET assembly is deployed.

See also 
.NET Framework
Common Language Runtime
Common Intermediate Language
Native Image Generator

References

External links 

 Ilasm.exe (MSIL Assembler) on MSDN
 Ngen.exe (Native Image Generator) on MSDN

.NET programming tools
Assemblers